Rockbridge is an unincorporated community located in the town of Rockbridge, Richland County, Wisconsin, United States.

Rockbridge sits is south-central Wisconsin. It has a population of 734. The median income is $65,996, slightly higher than the average of $64,168.

Notes

Unincorporated communities in Richland County, Wisconsin
Unincorporated communities in Wisconsin